Michael Madden (September 28, 1841 – August 7, 1920) was a Private in the United States Army and a Medal of Honor recipient for his role with the 42nd New York Infantry of the Union Army in the American Civil War.

Madden enlisted in the Army from New York City in June 1861, and was mustered out in July 1864.

Madden is buried in Mount Calvary Catholic Cemetery in Harrisburg, Pennsylvania. His grave can be located in Section O, Lot 165.

Medal of Honor citation
Rank and organization: Private, Company K, 42d New York Infantry.
Place and date: At Masons Island, Md., September 3, 1861. 
Entered service at: New York, N.Y. 
Born: September 28, 1841, Ireland. 
Date of issue: March 22, 1898.

Citation:

Assisted a wounded comrade to the riverbank and, under heavy fire of the enemy, swam with him across a branch of the Potomac to the Union lines.

See also

 List of Medal of Honor recipients
 List of American Civil War Medal of Honor recipients: M–P

Notes

References

This article includes text in the public domain from the United States Government.

External links
 

1841 births
1920 deaths
United States Army Medal of Honor recipients
Union Army soldiers
United States Army soldiers
Irish-born Medal of Honor recipients
Irish emigrants to the United States (before 1923)
Irish soldiers in the United States Army
American Civil War recipients of the Medal of Honor